The women's shot put event at the 2002 Commonwealth Games was held on 27–28 July.

Medalists

Results

Qualification
Qualification: 16.50 m (Q) or at least 12 best (q) qualified for the final.

Final

References
Official results
Results at BBC

Shot
2002
2002 in women's athletics